Souled Out (1999) was the third Souled Out professional wrestling pay-per-view (PPV) event produced by World Championship Wrestling (WCW). The event took place on January 17, 1999 from the Charleston Civic Center in Charleston, West Virginia.

The main event was a Stun Gun ladder match between Scott Hall and Goldberg, based on Hall helping Kevin Nash in beating Goldberg for the WCW World Heavyweight Championship and ending Goldberg's undefeated streak, the previous month at Starrcade. The objective of the match was to retrieve the stun gun by climbing the ladder and tasing the opponent with the gun to win the match. Goldberg won by tasing Hall after performing a Spear and a Jackhammer.

Storylines
The event featured wrestlers from pre-existing scripted feuds and storylines. Wrestlers portrayed villains, heroes, or less distinguishable characters in the scripted events that built tension and culminated in a wrestling match or series of matches.

Reception
In 2007, Arnold Furious of 411Mania gave the event a rating of 5.0 [Not So Good], stating, "This PPV doesn’t actually suck, which is a refreshing change. The very positive reviews at the time were probably down to the improvement over the previous six months worth of drek. Time isn’t kind to it. The cruiser 4-way doesn’t hold up too well (actually suggested as a MOTYC at the time, no really). Neither does anything else really. At least most of the show isn’t actively bad and nothing slips into negative snowflakes. Call this one thumbs in the middle."

Results

References

Souled Out
Events in West Virginia
Professional wrestling in West Virginia
1999 in West Virginia
January 1999 events in the United States
1999 World Championship Wrestling pay-per-view events